The Army Strategic Reserves Command (abbreviated ) is a combined-arms formation of the Indonesian Army. Kostrad is a Corps level command which has up to 35,000 troops. It also supervises operational readiness among all commands and conducts defence and security operations at the strategic level in accordance with policies under the command of the commander of the Indonesian National Armed Forces. In contrast to its name ("Reserves"), Kostrad is the main warfare combat unit of the Indonesian Army. While Kopassus is the elite-special forces of the Indonesian Army, Kostrad as "" or "Principal Operational Command" still maintains as the first-line combat formation of the Indonesian National Armed Forces along with the Kopassus. 

Kostrad falls under the army chief of staff for training, personnel, and administration. However, it comes under the Commander-in-Chief of the Indonesian National Armed Forces for operational command and deployment due to the status of Kostrad as one of the principal operation commands. Kostrad typically receives best equipment in the Army and its two armoured battalions received Leopard 2A4 and Leopard 2 Revolution tanks.

Starting 1984 the  has been charged to lead the conduct of combat operations, called defence and security operations.

History 
Kostrad came into being during military action for Indonesia's take over of Western New Guinea in 1960, and was formally constituted on 6 March 1961. Initially designated the Army General Reserve Corps, its name was changed to Kostrad in 1963.

General Suharto, was appointed as the first head of Kostrad in 1961, and it was in this role that he was able to assert the army's control in the days following the alleged coup attempt on the evening of 30 September and dawn of 1 October 1965, which ultimately led to Suharto replacing Sukarno as Indonesian president.

It also involved in Operation Lotus in the then-Portuguese Timor.

Kostrad troops have also been used beyond Indonesia's borders, as was the case with Garuda Contingent in Egypt (1973–78) and South Vietnam (1973–75) and with those in the United Nations Iran–Iraq Military Observer Group in the midst of the Iran–Iraq War of 1989 and 1990.

Function and main tasks 

Based on the Decree of the Armed Forces Commander Number: Kep / 09 / III / 1985 dated 6 March 1985 on the Principles of Organization and the task of the Strategic Command of the Armed Forces (Kostrad), it is stipulated that Kostrad as a major Administrative Command reports directly under the Army chief of staff while Kostrad Operational Main Command is directly under the commander of the Indonesian National Armed Forces. Kostrad was principally responsible for fostering operational readiness on all of its command lines and conducting Strategic Defense Security Operations in accordance with the policy of the Commander of the Indonesian National Armed Forces. To carry out these tasks, Kostrad organizes and carries out the main functions in the development of strength, combat and administration, the military's organic functions both intelligence, operations and training, personnel coaching, logistics, and territorial as well as the organic function of coaching in planning, controlling and supervision.

In the organizational field, Kostrad has an organizational structure established by the Chief of Staff of the Army based on the ACS Decree Regulation No. Kep / 9 / III / 85 dated 6 March 1985. Kostrad is headed by a Lieutenant-General who serves as the Commander of the Kostrad. In the daily duties of the Army Commander is assisted by a Chief of Staff bearing the rank of Major General, the auxiliary elements of the Staff, namely Personal Staff, Kostrad Inspectorate, and Kostrad General Staff, the Assistant Chief of Staff who served as the supervisor of the execution of their respective activities. Each field of activity, while the executive elements in Kostrad consist of the Executive Units, combat units, and Combat support units.

Strength 

Kostrad had a strength of 27,000 in 1998 and its primary components consist of two infantry divisions and an independent airborne brigade.

There were as of early 1998 a total of 33 airborne and infantry battalions within Kostrad. Each division contained three infantry and/or airborne brigades; an armoured battalion; cavalry reconnaissance company; field artillery regiment of three battalions; air defence artillery battalion; combat engineer battalion; supply and transportation battalion; medical battalion; signal company; military police company; field maintenance company; and a personnel and administrative detachment. Kostrad has 3 divisions which are:

There have been several reports that a third division was to be formed for Kostrad, for example in an announcement by then Kostrad commander Lieutenant General Hadi Waluyo on 16 March 2005. Waluyo's announcement indicated that the new division was to be formed around the 3rd Airborne Infantry Brigade, which would be shifted to a new site in Papua once the expansion programme had advanced further. After years of planning, the promised Third division was officially formed on 11 May 2018.

Special Unit

Combat Reconnaissance Platoon 

The "Combat Reconnaissance Platoon" of Kostrad ( abbreviated "") is a special unit formation of Kostrad in a platoon level to conduct Special reconnaissance (SR) operations. Its further information regarding number of troops and weaponry are confidential. It was formed in 2001 and is part of the Kostrad Intelligence Battalion. Tontaipur was formed under the auspices of the then Kostrad commander Lt Gen Ryamizard Ryacudu. Similar to other special units within the Indonesian National Armed Forces, Tontaipur is trained for land, air and sea combat special operations.

Commanders of Kostrad 

Many Kostrad commanders have gone on to very senior Indonesian posts. Soeharto became President; General Rudini became Minister of Home Affairs; General Wismoyo is married to the sister of Soeharto's late wife; and Lieutenant General Tarub became the armed forces' Chief of the General Staff. General Umar Wirahadikusumah would later become Vice-President.

Notes

External links 
 Official website of Kostrad
 Watchindonesia.org, Here come the Kostrad boys again

Military units and formations established in 1961
Army units and formations of Indonesia
Indonesian Army